Thadiparthy or Thatiparthy is a Panchayat and Revenue village in Ranga Reddy district in Telangana State, India. It falls under Yacharam mandal, and Division of Ibrahimpatnam Taluk, Ranga Reddy District, Telangana state, Postal code: 501509. It's just 50 km far away from Hyderabad city. 

It is depend on majorly agriculture source and it's cultivate mainly paddy, cotton and vegetables. It's huge source of irrigation system like ground water facility through pumping and man made Wells throughout the year.

History

Geography

Religious places

Transport

Politics

Schools

Agriculture

References

Villages in Ranga Reddy district